Philip De Catesby Ball (October 22, 1864 – October 22, 1933) was the owner of the St. Louis Terriers of the Federal League from  through  and the St. Louis Browns of the American League from  through .

Biography
He was born in Keokuk, Iowa. He died in St. Louis, Missouri of sepsis. Ball became wealthy through the ownership of the Federal Cold Storage Company refrigeration company in St. Louis; he expanded his holdings to include oil wells, ranch lands, and urban commercial real estate. He was considered the Federal League owner most committed to the development of a permanent third major league.

As the Federal League's bidding war with the established clubs took a financial toll on its owners, Ball remained committed to stocking a competitive roster. His strategy undermined the bottom line of the Terriers, Browns, and St. Louis Cardinals. As part of a final settlement, Robert Hedges sold the Browns to Ball, who was subsequently able to transfer a number of players from his folded club to his new franchise.

Legacy
Ball is perhaps best known for demoting pioneering baseball executive Branch Rickey from general manager to business manager in 1915, which led to his departure for the Cardinals. He considered Rickey's ideas, such as the development of an integrated farm system, to be too radical for the time; however, he also sought to prevent other teams from experimenting with these ideas by unsuccessfully seeking a court order to vacate Rickey's 1917 contract with the Browns' crosstown rivals.

Due to the poor fortunes of the team both financially and on the field, Ball's estate continued to own the Browns after his death until , when the team was sold to Donald Lee Barnes.

References

External links

1864 births
1932 deaths
Businesspeople from Iowa
Deaths from sepsis
Infectious disease deaths in Missouri
Major League Baseball executives
People from Keokuk, Iowa
St. Louis Browns owners
Businesspeople from St. Louis
Federal League executives